Solo in Japan is an album by American jazz saxophonist Charles Gayle recorded on July 6 and 7, 1997 for P.S.F. Records (PSFD-94).

Reception

The authors of the Penguin Guide to Jazz Recordings awarded the album 4 stars.

Writing for Acoustic Levitation, Carlos Gómez included the album in a "Best of 2012" list, and commented: "Mr. Gayle's character 'Streets' plays in a pure and touching mood.  Solo pieces on tenor and soprano saxophone or piano.  You don't need to think as you listen; go with what you feel."

Track listing 
 "Come Ye"—7:59
 "Walking Nearer"—15:01
 "Praise God"—9:46
 "Christ Changes You"—11:59
 "Woe and Joy"—11:36

Recordings 
Track 1,2,3,4 were live-recorded at Jazz-Cafe Narcissus in Shinjuku, Tokyo on July 6, 1997, and Track 5 was recorded at BarBer Fuji that is not only a barber but a live house in Ageo-city, Saitama on July 7, 1997. No voices or claps is heard but this is the live recordings.

Personnel 
Charles Gayle—tenor saxophone, soprano saxophone, piano

References

External links
 About recordings, see MEMO (in Japanese language) at 

1997 albums
Charles Gayle albums